North Carolina Highway 83 (NC 83) is a primary state highway in the U.S. state of North Carolina.  It serves to connect the towns of Maxton and Clio, South Carolina.

Route description
NC 83 is a two-lane  rural highway that begins at the South Carolina state line and goes north to end at NC 130 in Seven Bridges.  The highway is flanked by both farmland and swamps.

History
NC 83 was established in 1937 as a new primary routing from US 501 to the South Carolina state line, where it continues as SC 83.  In 1947, it was extended north to its current terminus at NC 130 in Seven Bridges.

Major intersections

References

External links

 
 NCRoads.com: N.C. 83

083
Transportation in Robeson County, North Carolina